The Woman in the Waves (French - La Femme à la vague) is an 1868 painting by Gustave Courbet, now in the Metropolitan Museum of Art in New York.

The picture is notable for its realistic flesh tones and trace of underarm hair.

The work is on view in the Metropolitan Museum's Gallery 811.

References

Paintings in the collection of the Metropolitan Museum of Art
1868 paintings
Paintings by Gustave Courbet
Nude art
Bathing in art